

Places
 High Desert, Albuquerque, New Mexico, a development in Albuquerque, New Mexico, United States
 High Desert (California), an area of Southern California deserts just north of the San Bernardino and Little San Bernardino Mountains.
 High Desert (Oregon), an area in eastern Oregon, United States
 High Desert County, California, a proposed county in Southern California
 Colorado Plateau, a high desert area in the United States of 337,000 km2 (130,000 mi2) in western Colorado, northwestern New Mexico, southern and eastern Utah, and northern Arizona.

Other
 High Desert Broadcasting, a radio broadcasting company
 The High Desert Museum in Bend, Oregon, United States
 High Desert State Prison (Nevada) in Indian Springs, Nevada
 High Desert State Prison (California) in Susanville, California